Bruidge mac Nath Í (died 579) was a king of the Uí Failge, a Laigin people of County Offaly. He was the grandson of Failge Berraide, the eponymous ancestor of the dynasty.<ref>Rawlinson Genealogies, pg.58</ref>

He is listed as king in the Book of Leinster king list though incorrectly as Bruidgi mac Cathair. He is also mentioned in a poem in the genealogies about the royal fort at Rathangan, County Kildare. The annals record his death in the year 579 and this may have been in warfare with the Ui Neill

Notes

See also
 Kings of Ui Failghe

References

 Byrne, Francis John (2001), Irish Kings and High-Kings, Dublin: Four Courts Press, 
 Ó Cróinín, Dáibhí (2005), A New History of Ireland, Volume One, Oxford: Oxford University Press

External links
CELT: Corpus of Electronic Texts at University College Cork

579 deaths
6th-century Irish monarchs
Year of birth unknown